The Procaer F.15 Picchio (Italian: "Woodpecker") is an Italian-designed light utility aircraft built by Procaer (PROgetti Costruzioni AERonautiche).

Design
The Picchio was developed in Italy in the late 1950s as a further development of Stelio Frati's Falco and Nibbio designs. Like its predecessors, the Picchio was a conventional low-wing cantilever monoplane of exceptionally clean lines, with retractable tricycle undercarriage. Early versions of the Picchio shared the same wooden construction as the earlier designs, but had a thin aluminium skin over the top of their plywood skins. The F.15E and F.15F, however, were all-metal.

Production
Production of the early, wooden Picchios was carried out by Procaer in Milan, but in the mid 1960s, Frati established General Avia as his own factory to build his designs, commencing with the F.15E. Only a few examples were built, however, and the design lay dormant until revived by an Austrian company, HOAC in the mid 1990s. HOAC arranged to have the two-seat F.15F model built at the JSC Sokol plant in Niznij Novgorod, but ran out of money, leaving Sokol with unsold airframes in various states of completion.

Operational history
The Picchio was primarily intended for operation by private pilot owners and the design was exported to several European countries as well as being purchased by Italian individuals. Several are still airworthy (2012).

Variants
 F.15 - prototype and initial production with  Lycoming O-320 engine and three seats. 5 built.
 F.15A - revised production version with  Lycoming O-360 engine and four seats. 10 built by Procaer.

 F.15B - similar to F.15A but with larger-span wings and fuel tanks relocated from fuselage to wings (20 built by Procaer).
 F.15C - version with  Continental IO-470-E engine and tip tanks. One built.
 F.15D - proposed version similar to F.15B with  Franklin engine. Not built.
 F.15E Picchio - Four-seat, all metal aircraft with fuel in wing and wing-tip tanks and powered by  Continental IO-520K engine. First prototype flown 21 December 1968 and second aircraft flown 1976.
 F.15F - All metal, four-seat derivative of F15.E with bubble canopy and powered by  IO-360 engine. One built by General Avia, flying 20 October 1977.
 F.15F Excalibur - F.15F built by JSC Sokol at Nizhny Novgorod, Russia for assembly by Eurospace in Italy. Pre-production aircraft assembled by HOAC in Austria and flown in October 1994. Orders for 33 aircraft at end of 1995, with about 100 in various stages of construction or assembly at that time.

Specifications (F.15B)

References

Further reading

 
 

Procaer aircraft
General Avia aircraft
1950s Italian civil utility aircraft
Single-engined tractor aircraft
Low-wing aircraft
Aircraft first flown in 1959